, whose name was also written as Asami Tohjoh, was a Japanese manga artist.

Works

Series

References

External links
 

1972 births
2007 deaths
Manga artists
Women manga artists
Japanese female comics artists
Female comics writers
Japanese women writers